Oil was first discovered in Oklahoma by, accident, in 1859, near Salina, in the then Oklahoma Territory, in a well that had been drilled for salt. In 1907, before Oklahoma became a state, it produced the most oil of any state or territory in the United States. From 1907 to 1930, Oklahoma and California traded the title of number one US oil producer back and forth. Oklahoma oil production peaked in 1927, at 762,000 barrels/day, and by 2005 had declined to 168,000 barrels/day, but then started rising, and by 2014 had more than doubled to 350,000 barrels per day, the fifth highest state in the U.S.

In the latter quarter of the 20th century, an average decline of 3.1%/year, until additional drilling led to a temporary increase from 1980 to 1984, followed by a decline at 6.6%/year until the average decline of 3.1% was met in 1994. As of September 2012, 72 out of the 77 counties in Oklahoma have producing oil or gas wells.

Oil drillers active in Oklahoma include Fred M. Manning. The first woman to drill a producing oil well on her own property, and the first female oil operator in Oklahoma was Lulu M. Hefner.

See also
Oil City, Oklahoma
Oklahoma City Oil Field

References

 
History of Oklahoma
History of the petroleum industry in the United States